The Collaborative Crop Research Program (CCRP) funds participatory, collaborative research on agroecological intensification (AEI). Funded projects typically link international, national, and local organizations with communities of smallholder farmers, researchers, development professionals, and other parties. Projects work together as part of a Community of Practice to generate technical and social innovations to improve nutrition, livelihoods, and productivity for farming communities in Africa and South America. Large-scale impact is realized when new ideas, technologies, or processes are adapted, when insights from research catalyze change in policy and practice, and when innovation inspires further success. The program is under the direction of Rebecca J. Nelson of Cornell University and Jane Maland Cady of the McKnight Foundation.

Program History
The McKnight Foundation began funding crop research in 1983 with the Plant Biology Program and granted $18 million through the program from 1983 to 1992. The CCRP began in 1993 with a $12 million, six-year effort to support agricultural research in developing countries.
 
In 2000, McKnight committed another $41.5 million over nine years. In late 2001 and mid-2002, the CCRP's Advisory Committee met to design the strategy for the next phase of grantmaking and identified specific topics for funding. 
 
In 2006, the CCRP adopted a place-based strategy for grantmaking, directing its investments to regional communities of practice in the Andes; West Africa; and Southern Africa.
 
In 2008, the Foundation committed $47 million over ten years for the next phase of funding for the program. In addition, the CCRP received a five-year $26.7 million grant from the Bill & Melinda Gates Foundation. This phase of funding allowed for the formation of an additional community of practice in East & Horn of Africa as well as additional resources to allow for more technical support to grantees from regional teams and other support persons.
 
In 2013, The McKnight Foundation received a renewal grant from the Gates Foundation to continue building CCRP programs. This funding will allow the CCRP to increase its focus on the integration of legumes into the cropping systems of Mali, Burkina Faso, Uganda, Ethiopia, and Tanzania as well as Niger, Kenya, Malawi, and Mozambique. Legumes are very important to African agriculture. They're a major source of dietary protein and help sustain more fertile soils. And they tend to be more adaptable than other crops to drought, low nutrients, and other soil and climatic extremes.

Place-based Learning 
Central to the CCRP’s place-based approach is the formation of four regional communities of practice (CoPs) in Africa and South America, where hunger and poverty levels are among the highest in the world. Grantees within these communities work together to strengthen institutional capacity to generate knowledge and spark innovation in agriculture research and development. The CoP model emphasizes networking, learning, and collective action. 

Andes CoP (Bolivia, Ecuador, and Peru)
The Andes CoP supports integrated and diverse production systems that embrace conservation and native agricultural biodiversity as part of its goal to raise the profile of traditional knowledge and understanding its relationship to scientific research. Funding is directed toward conservation of agricultural biodiversity, breeding and variety selection, seed systems,  integrated crop and pest management, risk management and climate variability, nutrition, soil fertility management, and market development.

East & Horn of Africa CoP (Ethiopia, Kenya, and Uganda)
The E&HAf CoP aims to improve performance of farming systems primarily through support for crop diversification, for crop improvement and diversification, and an emphasis on management strategies that enhance crop access to scarce soil nutrients and water resources and reduce pest and disease losses. The CoP is also turning attention to post-harvest issues such as consumption, storage, transformation, and markets to increase the likelihood that greater crop diversity will lead to better diets and livelihoods.

Southern Africa CoP (Malawi, Mozambique, and Tanzania)
The SAf CoP supports research on constraints to legume productivity, including foliar diseases, parasitic weeds, low availability of nitrogen and phosphorus as well as access to good quality planting seed. Recently the CoP has expanded its focus to include improvements in crop productivity and post-harvest practices; links between household food security and improved nutrition and incomes, with particular attention to the threat of aflatoxin contamination; and cross-cutting research in agriculture policy and communication.

West Africa CoP (Burkina Faso, Mali, and Niger)
The WAf CoP is striving to improve productivity and nutritional content of cereals (sorghum, pearl millet, and fonio) and grain legumes (cowpea, groundnut, and Bambara groundnut) as well as other traditional or introduced crops . Strengthening farming systems demands continued attention to improved soil and water conservation and agronomic management; better seed varieties and seed distribution systems; integrated pest management; strengthened and diversified value chains; improved diets and nutrition; and improved income and education for farming families.

Each CoP is supported by a regional team consisting of a regional representative, a liaison scientist, a monitoring and evaluation specialist, and a research methods specialist. The regional team's activities include support for grantmaking processes and support for funded project teams. Each regional team develops a regional analysis, strategy, and plan to inform regional grantmaking. The regional representative and liaison scientist work with potential grantees to support development of proposals. The regional team builds relationships with project teams and helps project members and other stakeholders connect to each other to foster learning and inspiration. The regional team conducts site visits and provides feedback to project teams on annual reports and project meetings. Research methods support is provided in a range of formats, including meetings with individual teams, workshops, and online forums. Similarly, integrated monitoring, evaluation, and planning support is provided through individual consultants and workshops.

Partial list of projects

    Yapuchiris II                            http://www.ccrp.org/projects/yapuchiris-ii
    Water security II                        http://www.ccrp.org/projects/water-security-ii
    Sustainable Production of Quinoa         http://www.ccrp.org/projects/sustainable-production-quinoa
    Soil nutrient budgets                    http://www.ccrp.org/projects/soil-nutrient-budgets
    Seed systems                             http://www.ccrp.org/projects/seed-systems-0
    SANREM                                   http://www.ccrp.org/projects/sanrem
    Quinoa sustainability                    http://www.ccrp.org/projects/quinoa-sustainability
    Quinoa III                               http://www.ccrp.org/projects/quinoa-iii
    Potato moth                              http://www.ccrp.org/projects/potato-moth
    Plot Diversification                     http://www.ccrp.org/projects/plot-diversification
    Organic groundnut III                    http://www.ccrp.org/projects/organic-groundnut-iii
    On-farm Conservation                     http://www.ccrp.org/projects/farm-conservation
    Nutrition support                        http://www.ccrp.org/projects/nutrition-support
    Native potato seed systems               http://www.ccrp.org/projects/native-potato-seed-systems
    Lupin/quinoa                             http://www.ccrp.org/projects/lupinquinoa
    Local Markets Cuzco                      http://www.ccrp.org/projects/local-markets-cuzco
    Laderas                                  http://www.ccrp.org/projects/laderas
    Green manures/legumes                    http://www.ccrp.org/projects/green-manureslegumes
    Food Sovereignty                         http://www.ccrp.org/projects/food-sovereignty
    Food security                            http://www.ccrp.org/projects/food-security
    Impact assessment of  Quinoa             http://www.ccrp.org/projects/financial-analysis-service-impact-assessment-quinoa
    Cover agriculture in the highland Andes  http://www.ccrp.org/projects/cover-agriculture-highland-andes
    Community baskets II                     http://www.ccrp.org/projects/community-baskets-ii
    Communal agricultural risk management    http://www.ccrp.org/projects/communal-agricultural-risk-management
    CLOSAN Impact Evaluation                 http://www.ccrp.org/projects/closan-impact-evaluation
    Climate risk management                  http://www.ccrp.org/projects/climate-risk-management
    Biopesticide/potato moth                 http://www.ccrp.org/projects/biopesticidepotato-moth
    Biodiversity of Andean tubers            http://www.ccrp.org/projects/biodiversity-andean-tubers
    Biodiversity and soil conservation       http://www.ccrp.org/projects/biodiversity-soil-conservation
    Andean pests                             http://www.ccrp.org/projects/andean-pests
    Andean Grain III                         http://www.ccrp.org/projects/andean-grain-iii
    Agrobiodiversity and Nutrition II        http://www.ccrp.org/projects/agrobiodiversity-nutrition-ii
    Soil fertility management                http://www.ccrp.org/projects/soil-fertility-management
    PV groundnut                             http://www.ccrp.org/projects/pv-groundnut
    P-Efficient Legumes III                  http://www.ccrp.org/projects/p-efficient-legumes-iii
    Legume Best Bets III                     http://www.ccrp.org/projects/legume-best-bets-iii
    Groundnut postharvest value chain        http://www.ccrp.org/projects/groundnut-postharvest-value-chain
    Groundnut Breeding III                   http://www.ccrp.org/projects/groundnut-breeding-iii
    Cowpea resistance to Alectra II          http://www.ccrp.org/projects/cowpea-resistance-alectra-ii
    Cowpea Alectra III                       http://www.ccrp.org/projects/cowpea-alectra-iii
    Climbing Beans II                        http://www.ccrp.org/projects/climbing-beans-ii
    Bruchid management II                    http://www.ccrp.org/projects/bruchid-management-ii
    Botanical pesticides/legumes             http://www.ccrp.org/projects/botanical-pesticideslegumes
    Bean Seed Delivery II                    http://www.ccrp.org/projects/bean-seed-delivery-ii
    Bambara Groundnut III                    http://www.ccrp.org/projects/bambara-groundnuts-iii
    Women ag production systems              http://www.ccrp.org/projects/women%E2%80%99s-ag-production-systems
    Technology Introduction                  http://www.ccrp.org/projects/technology-introduction
    Sorghum/millet improvement II            http://www.ccrp.org/projects/sorghummillet-improvement-ii
    Sorghum and millet improvement           http://www.ccrp.org/projects/sorghum-millet-improvement
    Soil and water conservation              http://www.ccrp.org/projects/soil-water-conservation
    Seed Systems Niger                       http://www.ccrp.org/projects/seed-systems-niger
    Seed Systems III                         http://www.ccrp.org/projects/seed-systems-iii
    Pathways to AEI                          http://www.ccrp.org/projects/pathways-aei
    P-efficient cowpea                       http://www.ccrp.org/projects/p-efficient-cowpea
    Grain Processing IV                      http://www.ccrp.org/projects/grain-processing-iv
    Grain legumes                            http://www.ccrp.org/projects/grain-legumes
    GIMEM III                                http://www.ccrp.org/projects/gimem-iii
    Fonio III                                http://www.ccrp.org/projects/fonio-iii
    Farmer-Led Research Networks             http://www.ccrp.org/projects/farmer-led-research-networks
    Farmer-led AEI in Burkina Faso           http://www.ccrp.org/projects/farmer-led-agroecological-intensification-burkina-faso
    Farmer Knowledge                         http://www.ccrp.org/projects/farmer-knowledge
    Dual-Purpose Sorghum and Cowpeas         http://www.ccrp.org/projects/dual-purpose-sorghum-cowpeas
    Bambara Nut II & III                     http://www.ccrp.org/projects/bambara-nut-ii-iii
    Bambara groundnut productivity           http://www.ccrp.org/projects/bambara-groundnut-productivity

References

Further reading
Collaborative Crop Research Program Website
CCRP brochure
Manning, Richard, Food's Frontier: The Next Green Revolution, North Point Press, 2000,

External links
Collaborative Crop Research Program Website
The McKnight Foundation
The McKnight Foundation Crop Research Program

Agricultural research
Crops